Will Adamsdale (born 1974) is an English actor, comedian and writer.

Adamsdale was educated at Eton College and the Oxford School of Drama. In 2004, he starred in a self-penned one man show called Jackson's Way at the Edinburgh Fringe. The intended run for the production was ten days, before the intervention of comedian Stewart Lee. Lee was so impressed by Adamsdale's work that he reportedly threw his full support behind Jackson's Way, lobbying for an extension of the run and using his clout within the industry to garner notice from critics and award committees. Adamsdale secured the Perrier Comedy Award for comedy.

Adamsdale has since created several new shows: The Receipt, The Human Computer, and The Summer House. The Receipt, a collaboration with sonic artist Chris Branch, used innovative sound effects to punctuate a story about the little man in the big city. It ran at the Edinburgh Fringe 2006, winning a Fringe First and a Total Theatre Award. It subsequently toured nationally, and internationally to the Melbourne Comedy Festival and 59E59 Theatres in New York.

In The Human Computer, Adamsdale, a self-confessed technophobe, explored the world of computers. The show premiered in the new Traverse 3 venue at the Edinburgh Fringe 2007.

He made his film acting debut in The Boat That Rocked as Newsreader John, in 2009.

He was a regular cast member of the Channel 4 2011 series Campus, playing Jason the University accountant.

References

Further reading

External links 
website

1974 births
Alumni of the Oxford School of Drama
English male stage actors
Living people
People from Hereford
People educated at Eton College
Date of birth missing (living people)
Place of birth missing (living people)